Daniele Petri (born 3 September 1980) is an professional Italian darts player who plays in the Professional Darts Corporation events. In 2021 he played the PDC Q-School

Darts career
He first made his mark when he played in the 2013 PDC World Cup of Darts with Matteo dal Monte and failed to get out the group stages, losing to Spain (Carlos Rodriguez and Antonio Alcinas) 5-3 and then Wales (Mark Webster and Richie Burnett) 5-0.
He then played in the 2014 PDC World Cup of Darts and 2015 PDC World Cup of Darts, teaming up with Marco Brentegani, losing to Netherlands (Michael van Gerwen and Raymond van Barneveld) 5-2 and Gibraltar (Dyson Parody and Manuel Vilerio) by the same score.

In the 2016 PDC World Cup of Darts campaign, teaming up Michel Furlani, they were whitewashed by Austria (Mensur Suljović and Rowby-John Rodriguez) 5-0, only averaging 76.93. Petri did have some success in the PDC when he played in the 2016 European Darts Open, become the first Italian to qualify for a European Tour event, taking legs off James Richardson, eventually losing 6-3.

In 2017, he again played in the 2017 PDC World Cup of Darts event, playing with Gabriel Rollo. They lost to the United States (Darin Young and Larry Butler) 5-1, averaging 83.48.

In 2020, he again played in the 2020 PDC World Cup of Darts events, played with Andrea Micheletti.

References

1980 births
Living people
Sportspeople from Udine
Italian darts players
Professional Darts Corporation associate players
PDC World Cup of Darts Italian team